New Pudsey railway station is in  Farsley, West Yorkshire, England, on the Calder Valley line from Leeds to Bradford Interchange, Halifax, Huddersfield, Manchester Victoria, and Blackpool North.

Facilities 

The station is staffed, and the ticket office is open from 05:55 to 19:00 on Mondays to Saturdays.  A ticket machine is also available.  Step-free access from the booking office to both platforms is provided via ramps to the footbridge that links them.  Train running information is available via passenger information screens and P.A announcements. The platforms are long enough to accommodate Intercity trains, and there is a large car park to the south of the station. New Pudsey was originally served by occasional through trains from Bradford Interchange to London Kings Cross.  However, after electrification of the East Coast Main Line, through services were routed via Shipley to Bradford Forster Square.

History

Pudsey was originally served by a short branch line running from Stanningley railway station to Pudsey Greenside opened in 1878 by the Great Northern Railway. In 1893 the line was extended through Greenside Tunnel to Laisterdyke, the original curve from Stanningley closed, and another (90°) curve to Bramley opened forming the Pudsey loop line railway. There were two stations on the loop, Pudsey Lowtown and Pudsey Greenside, conveniently located at either end of the town centre. Both closed on 15 June 1964 as a result of the Beeching Axe.

It was opened as a 'new' station for Pudsey; there is no place called New Pudsey.

The station is situated just under a mile west of the location of the former Stanningley railway station (formerly Stanningley for Farsley), which closed on 1 January 1968, having supposedly been replaced by New Pudsey, although the two catchment areas were largely different.

New Pudsey was one of the first railway stations to be specifically built as a railway station for motorists, being situated on the convergence of several main roads and the ring road, and after opening was featured in a film by British Transport Films for this reason.

Services

Eastbound
During Monday to Saturday daytimes, there are four trains an hour to Leeds; in the evenings this service runs twice hourly. One train each hour continues beyond Leeds to York and a second to Selby. On Sundays there is a thrice hourly service with one train each hour continuing to York.  From the winter 2019 timetable change, a new service to  via Selby has been introduced in place of the former Huddersfield - Bradford - Leeds service (which now only runs on Sundays), restoring through journey opportunities to local stations east of Leeds that were removed in December 2018.

Westbound
During Monday to Saturday daytimes there are four trains an hour to Bradford Interchange and Halifax. The service is thrice-hourly in the evenings with two trains per hour running to Manchester Victoria (one to Chester) and to Blackpool North. From the December 2019 timetable change, Huddersfield passengers now need to change at Bradford as the current through service has been curtailed there on weekdays and Saturdays (though the overall service pattern will remain unchanged, with a Hull to Halifax service taking its place). On Sundays, there are three trains per hour - one each to Manchester, Blackpool North and Huddersfield.

Transport links 

The next bus stops are on Stanningley Bypass (express services between Bradford and Leeds and local services between Pudsey Owlcotes Centre and Leeds), in Bradford Road (services to Leeds, Bradford, and Halifax).

New Pudsey Station on television

The station was featured in a 1969 Monty Python's Flying Circus sketch (Science Fiction Sketch/Man Turns Into Scotsman) in which Harold Potter (Michael Palin) is turned into a Scotsman by creatures from the planet Skyron in the galaxy of Andromeda. Graham Chapman and Eric Idle (with Idle in drag) briefly appear on Platform 1 early in the sketch as Mr and Mrs Samuel Brainsample. After the camera pans off Chapman and Idle, Palin is shown walking up the ramp from the platform toward town. At the beginning of the sketch reference is made to the alien visitors coming "to conquer and destroy the very heart of civilisation", with a fade-in to the sign reading "New Pudsey". Laughter follows.

References

External links

Railway stations in Leeds
DfT Category E stations
Railway stations opened by British Rail
Railway stations in Great Britain opened in 1967
Northern franchise railway stations
Pudsey